The Fehrenbach cabinet (German: Kabinett Fehrenbach) was the fourth democratically elected Reichsregierung of the German Reich. It was named after Reichskanzler (chancellor) Constantin Fehrenbach and took office on 25 June 1920 when it replaced the First Müller cabinet.

The cabinet was formed after the June elections to the new Reichstag which replaced the Weimar National Assembly. It was the first government since the German Empire ended in 1918 which did not include the Social Democratic Party of Germany (SPD). The SPD remained the strongest party after the elections, but its share of the vote dropped significantly. The government was formed by the Catholic Zentrum, the German Democratic Party (DDP) and the German People's Party (DVP).

Fehrenbach resigned in May 1921 after the DVP withdrew its support in protest over the government's agreement to fixing Germany's reparation payments to the Allies. The cabinet was followed by the first government of Joseph Wirth, the previous minister of finance.

Election and establishment
The Reichstag elections of 6 June 1920 brought a defeat for the parties that had carried the previous government—SPD, DDP and Zentrum, the so-called "Weimar Coalition". Their share of the popular vote had dropped from 74.8% in the January 1919 election to 43.6%. Gains were made both by the parties on the right—the DVP and DNVP—and the far left, the KPD and the USPD. Nationalistic voters blamed the Weimar Coalition for the lost war, for the severe stipulations of the Treaty of Versailles and for domestic unrest by workers like during the Ruhr Uprising. Those on the left felt betrayed by the SPD and the other parties of the political centre for siding with the military and other forces that had already been powerful under the Empire (bureaucracy, industrialists, land owners) against communist or socialist protests.

Since SPD, Zentrum and DDP now had only 225 of the 466 Reichstags seats, the old coalition lacked a majority. In addition, the elections did not take place in Schleswig-Holstein, Upper Silesia and East Prussia and West Prussia due to the scheduled plebiscites there. The sitting 42 delegates for these districts temporarily retained their seats until elections could be held in these regions. Given the shift in voting patterns, it was to be expected that similar losses would occur among the 35 seats held by SPD, DDP and Zentrum, further eroding the number of Weimar Coalition delegates.

On 8 June, the First Müller cabinet offered to resign and president Friedrich Ebert accepted, but asked the ministers to remain in office until a replacement cabinet could be formed. Since the old coalition had insufficient Reichstag support and the left-wing and right-wing parties would not cooperate, the only solution seemed to be to expand the existing coalition to the left or right. Also on 8 June, an article published in the SPD party newspaper Vorwärts and viewed as reflecting the party's official stance, categorically refused cooperation with the DVP and called on the USDP to drop its most radical demands, thereby making a centre-left coalition possible.

The Zentrum favoured maintaining the old coalition but was open to inclusion of the DVP. DDP and DVP as the smaller partners in any coalition were passive. Both saw working with the SPD as unavoidable. On 11 June, Ebert following the tradition of approaching the strongest party first, asked Hermann Müller, the caretaker Chancellor, to form a new cabinet. Müller contacted Arthur Crispien of the USDP to negotiate entry of the far-left party into the existing coalition. Crispien harshly refused and Müller handed back the task of forming a government on 12 June.

Since the next two parties in terms of the share of the vote were the USDP and DNVP and they occupied extreme positions in the political spectrum that made it unlikely that they would be able to form a government, on 13 June Ebert next turned to Rudolf Heinze of the DVP. Heinze met with SPD representatives and was refused. He then handed back the task of forming a cabinet.

Ebert on 14 June asked Karl Trimborn (Zentrum) who accepted but apparently signalled that he might be working only as a negotiator. Trimborn managed to gain the SPD's acceptance of a minority government based on Zentrum, DDP and DVP that the Social Democrats would support from outside until the Spa conference in July. After that date further cooperation between SPD and the government would depend solely on the latter's actions. Both DDP and DVP agreed in principle to such an arrangement and as early as 14 June, Constantin Fehrenbach was named as possible Reichskanzler. However, in a conversation between Ebert and Fehrenbach on 15 June, the latter said he did not feel up to the job and suggested  instead. Mayer refused on 16 June and on 17 June Ebert asked Fehrenbach to form a cabinet.

Disagreements between DDP and DVP further delayed proceedings but by 21 June 1920 Fehrenbach was appointed Chancellor. Problems with the DVP over appointments held things up for several for days, as the "industrialist" wing of that party objected to Joseph Wirth as Minister of Finance and made other demands. By threatening to resign, Fehrenbach succeeded in causing these demands to be withdrawn.
On 25 June 1920, the cabinet was officially formed.

The Ministerium für Wiederaufbau (Ministry for Reconstruction) was not assigned a minister, but represented in the cabinet by a Staatssekretär. In the final cabinet list, there were four ministers (plus the Chancellor) from the Zentrum, three DVP ministers, two from the DDP and two independents.

Overview of the members
The members of the cabinet were as follows:

Resignation
The matter of war reparations was the dominant issue during the whole tenure of the cabinet. This put a heavy strain on the coalition on which the government was based, with the DVP arguing that they could not support the policies of Foreign Minister Simons any longer. The DVP opposed making any counterproposal on reparations that could have been acceptable to the Allies. The end of the cabinet was finally brought about by the Londoner Ultimatum. By late April/early May there were rumours that the Allies were about to present a new payments schedule in connection with threats of new sanctions (as happened on 5 May). On 4 May, despite an uprising in Upper Silesia that had erupted the previous day, the cabinet decided to resign after the parties were unable to agree on whether to present the Allies with a new German proposal on reparations. President Ebert asked the government to remain in office until a new one could be formed and the cabinet agreed. It was succeeded on 10 May 1921 by the cabinet of Joseph Wirth, Finance Minister under Fehrenbach.

References

Historic German cabinets
1920 establishments in Germany
1921 disestablishments in Germany
Cabinets established in 1920
Cabinets disestablished in 1921
Coalition governments of Germany